Suevite is a rock consisting partly of melted material, typically forming a breccia containing glass and crystal or lithic fragments, formed during an impact event. It forms part of a group of rock types and structures that are known as impactites.

Name
The word "suevite" is derived from "Suevia", Latin name of Swabia. It was suggested by Adolf Sauer in 1901.

Formation
Suevite is thought to form in and around impact craters by the sintering of molten fragments together with unmelted clasts of the country rock. Rocks formed from more completely melted material found in the crater floor are known as tagamites. Suevite is distinct from the pseudotachylite in an impact structure as the latter is thought to have formed by frictional effects within the crater floor and below the crater during the initial compression phase of the impact and the subsequent formation of the central uplift.

Occurrence
Suevite is one of the diagnostic rock-types for large impact structures. It has been described from many of the larger impact structures identified on earth.
 Nördlinger Ries
 Sudbury Basin
 Popigai impact structure
 Chicxulub crater
 Kara crater
 Azuara impact structure

See also
Meteorite shock stage
Shock metamorphism

References

External links

 Page on Suevites from website on Impact Structures by Kord Ernstson & Fernando Claudin

Impact event minerals